The Houston Astros, originally called the "Colt .45s", are a Major League Baseball (MLB) franchise based in Houston, Texas. They play in the American League West division. Since the institution of Major League Baseball's Rule 4 Draft, the Astros have selected 57 players in the first round. Officially known as the "First-Year Player Draft", the Rule 4 Draft is Major League Baseball's primary mechanism for assigning amateur baseball players from high schools, colleges, and other amateur baseball clubs to its franchises. The draft order is determined based on the previous season's standings, and the team that had the worst record receives the first pick. In addition, teams which lost free agents in the previous off-season may be awarded compensatory or supplementary picks. The First-Year Player Draft is unrelated to the 1961 expansion draft in which the Astros initially filled their roster.

Of the 57 players picked in the first round by Houston, 24 have been pitchers, the most of any position; 21 of these were right-handed, while 3 were left-handed. Ten catchers were selected, while nine outfielders, nine shortstops, two first basemen, and two third basemen were taken as well. The team also selected one player at second base. Thirteen of the players came from high schools or universities in the state of California, while Texas and Tennessee follow with five and three players, respectively. They have also drafted two players from outside the United States: Carlos Correa (2012) and Ramón Castro (1994), both from Puerto Rico.

The Astros won their first World Series title in 2017 with three of their first-round picks on the World Series roster—Correa, series MVP George Springer (2011), and Alex Bregman (2015). One Astros first-round pick is a member of the Baseball Hall of Fame. Carlos Correa is the only Astros first-round pick to have won a Rookie of the Year award, joining Jeff Bagwell (1991, originally drafted by the Red Sox) as the two Astros to win ROY. No Astros first round pick has won a Most Valuable Player award or Cy Young Award with the team. Brad Lidge (1998) won the Comeback Player of the Year Award in 2008 with the Philadelphia Phillies, his first season after leaving the Astros.

The Astros have made 12 selections in the supplemental round of the draft. They have made the first overall selection in the draft five times; in 1976, 1992, 2012, 2013, and 2014. They have had 16 compensatory picks since the institution of the First-Year Player Draft in 1965. These additional picks are provided when a team loses a particularly valuable free agent in the prior off-season, or, more recently, if a team fails to sign a draft pick from the previous year. The Astros have failed to sign three of their first-round picks. First, pitcher Randy Scarbery (1970) did not sign though the Astros received no pick in compensation. John Burke (1991) and Brady Aiken (2014) also did not sign. The Astros were given the 37th pick of the 1992 draft and a pick in the 2015 draft in compensation for Burke and Aiken, respectively.

On January 13, 2020, Major League Baseball punished the Houston Astros for cheating during the 2017 regular and post-season by using cameras to steal signs and relaying them to hitters using a trash can. As a result, Houston lost their 2020 and 2021 first and second-round draft picks.

Picks

See also
Houston Astros minor league players

Footnotes
 Through the 2012 draft, free agents were evaluated by the Elias Sports Bureau and rated "Type A", "Type B", or not compensation-eligible. If a team offered arbitration to a player but that player refused and subsequently signed with another team, the original team was able to receive additional draft picks. If a "Type A" free agent left in this way, his previous team received a supplemental pick and a compensatory pick from the team with which he signed. If a "Type B" free agent left in this way, his previous team received only a supplemental pick. Since the 2013 draft, free agents are no longer classified by type; instead, compensatory picks are only awarded if the team offered its free agent a contract worth at least the average of the 125 current richest MLB contracts. However, if the free agent's last team acquired the player in a trade during the last year of his contract, it is ineligible to receive compensatory picks for that player.
The Astros lost their first-round pick in 1980 to the California Angels as compensation for signing free agent Nolan Ryan.
The Astros lost their first-round pick in 1981 to the Texas Rangers as compensation for signing free agent Dave Roberts.
The Astros gained a supplemental pick in 1989 for losing free agent Nolan Ryan.
The Astros gained a compensatory first-round pick in 1990 from the San Francisco Giants for losing free agent Kevin Bass.
The Astros gained a supplemental pick in 1990 for losing free agent Kevin Bass.
The Astros gained a supplemental pick in 1991 for losing free agent Danny Darwin.
The Astros gained a supplemental pick in 1991 for losing free agent Dave Smith.
The Astros gained a supplemental pick in 1991 for losing free agent Franklin Stubbs.
The Astros gained a supplemental pick in 1992 for failing to sign their 1991 first-round pick John Burke.
The Astros gained a compensatory first-round pick in 1994 from the San Francisco Giants for losing free agent Mark Portugal.
The Astros gained a supplemental pick in 1994 for losing free agent Mark Portugal.
The Astros gained a compensatory first-round pick in 1998 from the Colorado Rockies for losing free agent Darryl Kile.
The Astros gained a supplemental pick in 1998 for losing free agent Darryl Kile.
The Astros gained a supplemental pick in 1999 for losing free agent Randy Johnson.
The Astros lost their first-round pick in 2003 to the San Francisco Giants as compensation for signing free agent Jeff Kent.
The Astros lost their first-round pick in 2004 to the New York Yankees as compensation for signing free agent Andy Pettitte.
The Astros gained a supplemental pick in 2005 for losing free agent Carlos Beltrán.
The Astros lost their first-round pick in 2007 to the Texas Rangers as compensation for signing free agent Carlos Lee.
The Astros gained a supplemental pick in 2008 for losing free agent Trever Miller.
The Astros gained a compensatory first-round pick in 2010 from the Detroit Tigers for losing free agent José Valverde.
The Astros gained a supplemental pick in 2010 for losing free agent José Valverde.
The Astros lost their first-round pick as punishment for their role in the sign stealing scandal.

References
General references

In-text citations

First-round draft picks
Houston Astros first-round draft picks